The 2020 season was the 48th season in the history of Júbilo Iwata and the club's first season back in the second division of Japanese football since 2015.

Players

First-team squad
As of 28 June 2020

Out on loan

Competitions

Overall record

J2 League

League table

Results summary

Results by round

Matches

References

Júbilo Iwata seasons
Júbilo Iwata